The first series of Promi Big Brother began on 13 September 2013 and ended on 27 September 2013. It is the first series of the Big Brother franchise on Sat.1, after it left RTL II, and the first in Germany after a 2-year hiatus. 12 housemates ("promis") entered the house on Day 1 with one more joining during the series. The show is co-hosted by Cindy aus Marzahn and Oliver Pocher.

Format 
Promi's had participated in tasks and matches for treats or to avoid punishments. Daily nominations also took place (from Day 8 to 14).

House
Promi Big Brother has its own Diary Room called "The Consultation Room". The Consultation Room is where Promi's can talk to Big Brother in private if ever they feel upset, lonely, angry or in seek of help and advice. Much of the house seems to have a similar design to that of the eighth series of Celebrity Big Brother UK. The bedroom was based on a forest theme just like the fifth series of Big Brother UK. The bedroom has secret storage cupboards hidden behind the walls. The garden has a swimming pool with a small boat floating in it. There is also a lifeguard chair next to the pool in homage to Promi David Hasselhoff and his previous role in Baywatch.

Promis 
In Promi Big Brother, the celebrities are called "Promis" rather than the traditional "Housemates" that had been used in the previous 11 series of normal Big Brother Germany. Originally 12 Promi's entered the house on Day 1.

On Day 5, David was given news by Big Brother that his father was ill. David decided to walk from the house later that evening to be with his father. On Day 7, Georgina entered the house as a replacement Promi for David. On Day 8, Sarah Joelle walked from the house after receiving bad news from Big Brother about her family.

Houseguests 
On Day 12 Pamela Anderson entered the house, as a Special Guest Star, staying until the final day.

Nominations Table

Notes 

Georgina cannot be nominated after one day in the house. Natalia is exempt from being nominated because she was being fake evicted by Big Brother to live in a secret loft for the next 24 hours.
The result of Day 9's and Day 10's nomination will be added together and one housemate will be evicted on Day 10.
Fancy, Manuel, Marijke & Natalia were nominated. Pamela Anderson could save one of the nominees. She chose Manuel.

Nominations: Results

References

External links 
Official Homepage

01